Hector Berlioz (1803–1869) was a French Romantic composer.

Berlioz may also refer to:
 Berlioz (surname)
 Berlioz Point, a headland of Antarctica
 69288 Berlioz, an asteroid
 MS Berlioz, a ship owned by Eurotunnel operated by MyFerryLink
 Berlioz (The Aristocats), a fictional grey kitten from The Aristocats